Peters's mouse (Mus setulosus) is a species of rodent in the family Muridae.
It is found in Benin, Cameroon, Central African Republic, Republic of the Congo, Democratic Republic of the Congo, Ivory Coast, Equatorial Guinea, Ethiopia, Gabon, Ghana, Guinea, Kenya, Liberia, Nigeria, Sierra Leone, Togo, and Uganda.
Its natural habitats are subtropical or tropical dry forests and dry savanna.

References

Mus (rodent)
Mammals described in 1876
Taxa named by Wilhelm Peters
Taxonomy articles created by Polbot